Leo C. Popkin (1914–2011) was a film director and producer in the United States. His brother Harry M. Popkin was the executive producer of Million Dollar Productions, a partnership that included Ralph Cooper.

He managed African American movie theaters in Los Angeles. He is known for his gangster films.

He and his brother Harry M. Popkin (1906 – October 7, 1991) worked on movies together.

Filmography
The Flaming Crisis (1924), co-director
The Duke Is Tops (1938), producer
Gang Smashers (1938), director
Reform School (1939)While Thousands Cheer (1940), directorFour Shall Die (1940), co-directorMy Dear Secretary (1948), producerD.O.A. (1949), producer
Impact, producer
Champagne for Caesar (1950), co-producer
The Well (1951), co-director and co-producer

References

1914 births
2011 deaths
American film directors